Before the Dawn is a Finnish melodic death metal/gothic metal band formed in 1999 by Tuomas Saukkonen.

History 
The band was founded in 1999 by Tuomas Saukkonen as his solo project: "I played and recorded all instruments in the first demo To Desire Part 1 by on my own then for the second demo I had a friend of mine on the drums. The first line-up was gathered so that BTD could perform live. With many changes in the line up BTD entered the studio to record the MCD called Gehenna. I received couple of deal offers but nothing serious enough. BTD continued playing gigs and I kept on writing lots of new material, and the next MCD called My Darkness got very good feedback and a serious enough record deal was offered by Locomotive Music."

Joined by Panu Willman, Mike Ojala, and Kimmo Nurmi, the newly formed lineup released their first full-length album, My Darkness, in 2003. It was followed up by a second album in 2004, 4:17 am. The band supported Katatonia on a Scandinavian and European tour in 2003.

In 2005, Saukkonen announced a new lineup for the band, removing all the members currently in and replacing them with his so-called "Live Assault Team": Norwegian Lars Eikind (Winds, Age of Silence, Khold) on clean vocals and bass, Gloria Morti guitarist Juho Räihä, keyboarder Joel Mäkinen and drummer Aatu Mukka. The reason was that Saukkonen felt that the previous band members were badly motivated and not professional enough.

The Ghost CD released in 2006, however, rather turned out to be another solo project for Tuomas. Because of the huge amount of song material written for that album, Saukkonen created another album, The Darkness, for a side-project, Dawn of Solace.

With Lars and Juho as new permanent band members, the band released the next full-length album Deadlight in 2007.
The single "Deadsong", released in February 2007, immediately reached #2 on Finnish Top 20 charts; for four months it remained among the Top 20 of Finnish Radio Rock. The single "Faithless" featuring Jone Nikula on the Pantera cover "Mouth for War", reached #2 on the Finland Top 20 charts for the week of 15 July 2007.

During the recording sessions for the fifth studio album Soundscape of Silence, drummer Dani Miettinen dropped out; the band decided to leave the position vacant and work with session drummers for live shows (e.g. Matti Auerkallio). Right after its release at the end of October 2008, Soundscape of Silence went to the top 20 of Finnish album charts (#14).
The core band members were later joined by drummer Atte Palokangas (from the band Agonizer). Atte became an official new band member in mid-2009, and Before the Dawn supported Amorphis on their Forging Europe Tour in late 2009 with a completed line-up.

The anniversary EP Decade of Darkness went straight to #1 on Finnish single charts after its release in spring 2010. The music video for "End of Days" from this EP was released throughout Europe and in Japan; it shows footage from the band's 2010 shows in Asia. The European edition of this EP, released in February 2011, contains a bonus DVD with footage of the band's concert at German Summerbreeze Festival 2009.

In February 2011, Tuomas Saukkonen won the Finnish Metal Award in the category "Best Instrumentalist"; Before the Dawn reached #3 in the category "Best Band". Tuomas defended this title successfully in the year 2012 as well.

The new album Deathstar Rising cracked the Finnish Album Top 10 and reached #8 in first week of March 2011.

In June 2011 bassist and vocalist Lars and drummer Atte left the band; Lars for personal reasons and Atte for musical reasons.
On 25 January 2012 the band announced on their Facebook page that Rise of the Phoenix would be the title of their new album. It was released through Nuclear Blast Records on 27 April 2012. Frontman Tuomas Saukkonen commented:
"Massive changes in the line-up during 2011 ended an era of great frustration and brought back 110% dedication and professionalism into the band. The newfound energy and motivation steered us into a victorious European tour and made it possible to produce the strongest, fastest, heaviest and definitely the most epic Before the Dawn album so far!"

On 10 January 2013 through a press statement, Tuomas Saukkonen announced that he was putting Before the Dawn to rest along with his other active bands (Black Sun Aeon and RoutaSielu), ending them in order to create new project called "Wolfheart", which he will entirely focus from now on. When interviewed by website KaaosZine, Saukkonen replied about his decision:

"...I have been thinking about this already for a few years from the Before the Dawn side and first time this was brought into the table was when we were releasing the Decade of Darkness EP to celebrate the 10th year for Before the Dawn. At that time I had an idea to end the band because it just felt right to end the band at that point. The band played their biggest shows in Europe by supporting Amorphis and in Asia by supporting Stratovarius. The CDs were selling great and we ended up signing a deal with Nuclear Blast Records. The album that came after the EP titled Deathstar Rising did an amazing job in the Finnish charts ending into the top 10. Still even though we achieved a lot I started to feel like it's becoming more and more of a job for me and felt that I was drifting away from the most important thing in my life which is for the love of making music."
"At that time we also started to have a little bad chemistry within the band and it also started to reflect into the band's live performances as well as into my own motivation towards the band because I became a bit frustrated. The line-up changes in 2011 gave me more motivation and it once again started to feel like it was right thing to continue after the Rise of the Phoenix album but after the successful tours in Finland and Europe and the great response to the CD both among the fans and press really gave me the opportunity to let go of my 'old friend' from the past 14 years. I felt like a winner and decided to put it aside because I could with a large smile remember all that great things we experienced with this band."
"At some point I recognized I was just keeping the band alive and it didn't feel so right anymore. I lost the passion to make music my own way and the main reason why I had a lot of side projects like Black Sun Aeon, Routasielu, Dawn of Solace and The Final Harvest at the first place. Those were the bands where I had the ability to be artistically free and create what I wanted. Now when Before the Dawn is done it was logical for me to clean the table at once and start building something from scratch again."

In 2021, the band was reformed. On 30 April, the band released the single "The Final Storm". The single was made for the Deadlight reissue which was released in 9 July 2021. On 7 September 2022 BTD announced that a new member Paavo Laapotti joins the band as a vocalist, while Tuomas takes up live drumming. A new album to come up in early summer 2023.

Members 

Current
 Tuomas Saukkonen – drums, studio guitars and keyboards (1999–2013, 2021-present), harsh vocals and rhythm guitar (1999–2013, 2021-2022)
 Paavo Laapotti - vocals
 Juho Räihä – lead guitar
 Pyry Hanski – bass guitar

Former
 Lars Eikind – bass, clean vocals
 Joonas Kauppinen – drums
 Ukri Suvilehto – live drums

Timeline

Discography

Studio albums

Demos

Videography

DVD

Music videos

EPs

Singles

References

External links 

 
 Bio at Locomotive Records
 Bio at Nuclear Blast Records
 Gothtronic review of The Ghost
 Metalkingdom Before The Dawn discography
 Interview with Tuomas Saukkonen from STALKER Magazine

Finnish heavy metal musical groups
Finnish gothic metal musical groups
Finnish melodic death metal musical groups
Musical groups established in 1999
Musical groups disestablished in 2013
Musical groups reestablished in 2021
Musical quartets
Nuclear Blast artists
Locomotive Music artists
1999 establishments in Finland